The 2003 WNBA draft, both the dispersal draft and the regular WNBA draft, took place on April 24.  The dispersal draft involved players from the rosters of the Portland Fire and Miami Sol teams which had both folded after the 2002 season. For that reason, Miami's picks obtained in trades were lost. 

The year brought multiple changes.  Along with the folding of the Fire and the Sol, two teams moved to new cities.  The Utah Starzz moved from Salt Lake City, Utah, to San Antonio, Texas, changing their name to the San Antonio Silver Stars, and the Orlando Miracle moved from Orlando, Florida, to Uncasville, Connecticut, to become the Connecticut Sun.  The Sun became the first franchise not to be based in a city that also was home to an NBA franchise.

The draft itself also changed.  Instead of the previous four-round format, the 2003 draft shrunk to its current format of only three rounds.

Key

Dispersal draft

College draft

Round 1

Notes:

Round 2

Round 3

References

Draft
2003